A Date with a Dream is a 1948 British musical comedy film directed by Dicky Leeman and starring Terry-Thomas, Jeannie Carson and Wally Patch. Its plot concerns a wartime group of musical entertainers who meet up a year after being demobbed and decide to reform their act. This was one of Terry-Thomas's earliest films and is reputedly partly based on his own experiences. Terry-Thomas was yet to develop his cad persona and a then little-known Norman Wisdom appears in a very brief, non-speaking role.

Plot
When an Army concert party is disbanded after the war, they plan to meet up in a years time for a reunion. When they do they discover that all the various members aren't coping too well with civilian life. Jean, a singer who is staying in the same house as two of the ex-concert party members, suggests that the various members get back together to perform.

Cast
 Terry-Thomas – Terry
 Jeannie Carson – Jean
 Len Lowe – Len
 Bill Lowe – Bill
 Wally Patch – Uncle
 Vic Lewis – Vic
 Ida Patlanski – Bedelia
 Joey Porter – Max Imshy
 Alfie Dean – Joe
 Julia Lang – Madam Docherty
 Harry Green – Syd Marlish
 Norman Wisdom – Shadow Boxer
 Sydney Bromley – Stranger in Max's office

Critical reception
Sky Movies wrote, "a sparkling performance from the young Terry-Thomas and a bright, sassy attitude saves this dated, rather choppy little filler item from the scrapheap of movie history. Worth a look for nostalgia buffs and curio collectors".

A Date With A Dream was the first production of Tempean Films, a production company founded by Monty Berman and Robert S. Baker following their war service. Of the film, Baker later commented, "It didn't make us a penny, but it gave us a good introduction to the film business". Tempean would go on to produce many British B-movies throughout the 1950s and into the early 1960s

References

External links
 
 dvd of the film

 interview British Entertainment History Project

1948 films
British musical comedy films
1948 musical comedy films
British black-and-white films
1940s English-language films
1940s British films